Richard Feldman is a Grammy Award-winning American songwriter and producer, raised in Tulsa, Oklahoma. He worked at Leon Russell's The Church Studio in Tulsa before moving to Los Angeles in 1978, where he worked at Shelter Records. That year he co-wrote "Promises" for Eric Clapton with Roger Linn. The demo was recorded using an early version of the Linndrum. He also wrote songs for the Pointer Sisters, Atlantic Starr, Don Williams, Joe Cocker, The Wailing Souls and many others as well as writing and producing music for Belinda Carlisle, Shakespears Sister and Midge Ure.

Feldman won a Grammy for best reggae album in 2004 for Toots and the Maytals True Love. He is currently president of the Association of Independent Music Publishers "aimp.org", and president of Artists First Music LLC.

References

Year of birth missing (living people)
Living people
Songwriters from Oklahoma
Record producers from Oklahoma
Musicians from Tulsa, Oklahoma
Grammy Award winners